Mendenhall is a city in Simpson County, Mississippi, United States. The population was 2,504 at the 2010 census. It is the county seat of Simpson County. Mendenhall is part of the Jackson Metropolitan Statistical Area. Mendenhall has one of the highest trained  volunteer fire depts in the area. Mendenhall has 1 full-time fire marshall. Of the 30 members 17 are NFPA 1001 Base certified, 2 are NFPA 1001-2 certified, 1 paramedic and 8 emt's, 4 are first responder certified. Mendenhall has 3 class A pumpers with 1 being a dual purpose engine that has equipment for rescue and medical calls, 1 3,000 gallon tanker, 1 custom brush truck. Mendenhall carries a class 6 fire rating.

History
Mendenhall was originally called Edna, to honor the wife of developer Phillip Didlake. After learning that a town with that name already existed in Mississippi, the city had its name changed to Mendenhall to honor Thomas Mendenhall, a citizen and lawyer from Westville, Mississippi (which has become a ghost town).

Mendenhall is the county seat of Simpson County. The county courthouse was built in 1907 by architect Andrew J. Byron.

The Mendenhall Public School mascot is the Tigers. Also located in Mendenhall is Simpson County Academy. The school mascot is the Cougars. Mendenhall's zip code is 39114.

According to Charles Baldwin, Simpson County Tax Collector, Mendenhall annexed Weathersby in the 1980s.

B & B Meat Market and Deli is located in Mendenhall and has been awarded "Best Burger in Mississippi" by the Mississippi Beef Council in 2017 and 2019.

Geography

Demographics

2020 census

As of the 2020 United States census, there were 2,199 people, 1,024 households, and 641 families residing in the city.

2000 census
As of the census of 2000, there were 2,555 people, 938 households, and 678 families residing in the city. The population density was 480.4 people per square mile (185.4/km). There were 1,039 housing units at an average density of 195.4 per square mile, (75.4/km). The racial makeup of the city was 71.23% White, 27.98% African American, 0.04% Native American, 0.12% Asian, 0.08% from other races, and 0.55% from two or more races. Hispanic or Latino people of any race were 1.02% of the population.

There were 938 households, out of which 31.9% had children under the age of 18 living with them. 50.0% were married couples living together, 16.7% had a female householder with no husband present and 28.9% were non-families. 25.4% of all households were made up of individuals, and 14.2% had someone living alone who was 65 years of age or older. The average household size was 2.54 and the average family size was 3.04.

In the city, the population was spread out, with 25.7% under the age of 18, 9.2% from 18 to 24, 26.2% from 25 to 44, 20.5% from 45 to 64, and 18.3% who were 65 years of age or older. The median age was 37 years. For every 100 females, there were 88.3 males. For every 100 females age 18 and over, there were 85.7 males.

The median income for a household in the city was $26,944, and the median income for a family was $32,656. Males had a median income of $30,335 versus $17,328 for females. The per capita income for the city was $14,340. About 23.6% of families and 26.0% of the population were below the poverty line, including 36.3% of those under age 18 and 12.9% of those age 65 or over.

Entertainment attractions

Mendenhall had a movie theatre called the Star Theatre, built by Edgar French, Ben Slay and Lonnie Burnham. Located on Main Street, the building boasted a one-screen auditorium with a balcony. It also featured a pool hall and three offices upstairs, one of which housed the city's Chamber of Commerce. The theatre opened for business on November 9, 1938 with the western Born to the West. The price of admission was 11 cents and a box of popcorn was a dime. A man from Prentiss was initially hired to run the theatre, but he was soon "sent packing" and Edgar French told his son, George Lewis French, "You're taking over that picture show".

Lewis French, who had worked in his father's ice plant growing up and was trained as a bookkeeper at Clarks Commercial College in Jackson, had no experience in running a movie theatre. He went to New Orleans to learn how to book movies and run the projection equipment. Aside from time spent serving in Europe as a radio man during World War II, French continued to operate the Star Theatre until he decided to close it in 1971.

During the late 1960s, the Star Theatre had problems with vandalism and growing racial tensions among its young patrons who objected to maintaining segregation. Under Jim Crow customs, black customers were required to sit in the segregated balcony and this only changed after new U.S. legislation was enacted and ended such practices.

In October 1979, a newly remodeled and fully integrated Star Theatre reopened under the ownership of Danny Collins, a young local entrepreneur. Its first movie was the Chuck Norris film A Force of One. The theatre enjoyed revived popularity until competition from video arcades and cable TV forced Collins to close some three years later.

The theatre was repainted when used as a location for the film My Dog Skip. Heavy rains caused the roof to collapse in April 2008. The theatre burned down in 2016.

Notable people
Pauline Braddy, drummer
Mollie Magee Van Devender, Miss Mississippi, 1975
Kimberly McGuffee Mansour, Miss Mississippi, 1986
Patrick Davis Smith, American author. His work was nominated seven times for the Pulitzer Prize and five times for the Nobel Prize for Literature
Larry Hardy, professional football player
Stephen Hobbs, professional football player
John M. Perkins, civil rights activist
Paul Ramsey, Christian ethicist
Martinas Rankin, professional football player

References

Cities in Mississippi
Cities in Simpson County, Mississippi
County seats in Mississippi
Cities in Jackson metropolitan area, Mississippi